Moses Bildad Adome (born 28 December 1983) is a Ugandan administrator and politician. He is the elected Member of Parliament for Jie County, Kotido District, and a representative for NRM, the ruling political party in Uganda. He is a member of the NRM Parliamentary Caucus and serves on the Committee on Health in the 10th Parliament of Uganda. Also, he is the founding chairperson of the USAID funded Warrior Squad Foundation (WSF), based in Karamoja Sub-region.

See also 
Kotido District
Karamoja
National Resistance Movement

References

External links 
 Website of the Parliament of Uganda
  Link to Warrior Squad Foundation

Living people
1983 births
Members of the Parliament of Uganda
People from Northern Region, Uganda
Gulu University alumni
21st-century Ugandan politicians